Mário Manuel Veloso de Araújo Cabral (15 January 1934 – 17 August 2020), commonly known by the nickname "Nicha" Cabral, was a racing driver from Portugal. He participated in five Formula One World Championship Grands Prix (four starts), debuting on 23 August 1959. He did not score any championship points.

Racing career
Son of the second marriage of the 1st Count of Vizela, Cabral was regarded as Portugal's outstanding driver of the late 1950s and competed in the Portuguese Grand Prix in 1959 and 1960 finishing in tenth place and retiring respectively.
 
In the 1959 Grand Prix at the Circuito de Monsanto, he was responsible for causing the accident which left future triple world champion Jack Brabham lucky to escape with his life. He collided with the Australian while he was being lapped, causing Brabham to spin and then somersault into a telegraph post. Brabham was thrown out of the car, which landed in the middle of the circuit, but was avoided by the other drivers. Cabral finished the race in 10th place, 4 laps down. He was the first Portuguese driver to start a Formula One race.

Cabral did not pursue a full-time racing career but drove for Scuderia Centro Sud in the 1961 Pau Grand Prix. His career was then interrupted by National Service which he spent as a paratrooper in Angola. He returned to Formula One with Centro Sud in 1963 retiring from the German Grand Prix and failing to qualify at Monza. His Formula One career ended with a retirement from the 1964 Italian Grand Prix in the Derrington-Francis-ATS.

Cabral was seriously injured in the 1965 Formula Two Rouen-Les-Essarts Grand Prix and was absent from competition until 1968 when he returned to race sportscars and occasionally in Formula Two before retiring in 1975.

Complete Formula One World Championship results
(key)

References
Footnotes

Sources
Profile at www.grandprix.com

1934 births
2020 deaths
Portuguese racing drivers
Portuguese Formula One drivers
Scuderia Centro Sud Formula One drivers
Derrington-Francis Formula One drivers
24 Hours of Le Mans drivers
Sportspeople from Porto
World Sportscar Championship drivers
12 Hours of Reims drivers